The Pakistan Army Corps of Engineers, (Urdu: ﺁرمى انجنيرينگ كور; Army Engineering Corps), is an administrative branch, and a major science and technology command of the Pakistan Army.  Although the Corps is generally associated with dams, canals and flood protection, it performs variety of public works for the Government of Pakistan, only if it is ordered by the Prime Minister.

Besides the performing and undertaking the combat and military engineering operations, the Corps operates major engineering organizations such as the Military Engineering Service (MES), the Frontier Works Organisation (FWO), and the Survey of Pakistan. The Corps is commanded by a three-star general— a Lieutenant-General— who is designated as the Engineer-in-Chief, serving as the Chief Army Topographer, and consults and guides the Chief of Army Staff in matters of science and technology. The current Engineer-in-Chief and current commander of the Corps of Engineers is Lieutenant General Moazzam Ijaz.

History
Initially part of the Indian Army Corps of Engineers which dates back to 1780, the Corps of Engineers came in its own on 14 August 1947, following the birth of Pakistan. At that time, the organisation was named "The Royal Pakistan Engineers", which remained so till March 1956, when Pakistan become a Republic, and its name changed to the "Corps of Engineers".

The partition of British India, led to a share of the British Indian Army units being allotted to Pakistan; amongst these were 34 Engineer units and subunits. The field units were from the Bengal and Bombay groups, roughly two-thirds of the former, and one-third of the latter. The units transferred from the Bengal Group were  H.Q. 622 Corps Engineer Group, with 31 Assault Field Company, 33 Parachute Field Squadron, along with 2, 4, 5, 68, 70 and 71 Field Companies, 43 and 322 Field Park Companies and a number of E. & M., Railway and other specialist units. From the Bombay Group, Pakistan received Headquarters 474 Army Engrs, 17 91 and 98 Field Companies, 42 Field Park Company, a troop of 411 Para Field Squadron ex Karachi, and 489 Independent Stores Platoon.
The Corps took active military participation in the 1965 war, the 1971 war, the 1999 war, the 2001 standoff and the current operations as of 2000s.

Activities
During the Kashmir earthquake of 2005, the Corps initiated the massive and one of the largest rehabilitation and reconstruction operations in Corps history, rebuilding and redesigning the entire cities of Gilgit and Muzaffarabad as well as Azad Kashmir. Its speedy rehabilitation operation was completed in record time and the entire city was rebuilt in 2008. As more recently, the Corps undertook the intensive rehabilitation and reconstruction operations in deluge in southern parts as well as recent earthquake in Western parts.

Since its inception, the Corps has built extensive military and civilian infrastructure of Pakistan Armed Forces as well as Pakistan Government, ranging from building bridges, dams, military regional headquarters and civil corporate architectural buildings. The Corps mission has been extended with time passes, and is renowned to have designed, construct, and built the GHQ, ammunition plants, army cantonments, as well as Kahuta Project and its related research facilities.

Current units

 1 Engineer Battalion
 2 Engineer Battalion
 3 Engineer Battalion
 4 Engineer Battalion
 5 Engineer Battalion
 6 Engineer Battalion
 7 Engineer Battalion
 10 Engineer Battalion
 11 Engineer Battalion
 12 Engineer Battalion
 14 Engineer Battalion
 16 Engineer Battalion
 18 Engineer Battalion
 19 Engineer Battalion
 20 Engineer Battalion
 21 Engineer Battalion
 22 Engineer Battalion

 23 Engineer Battalion
 24 Engineer Battalion
 25 Engineer Battalion
 26 Engineer Battalion
 100 Engineer Battalion
 103 Engineer Battalion
 104 Engineer Battalion
 105 Engineer Battalion
 106 Engineer Battalion
 107 Engineer Battalion
 108 Engineer Battalion
 109 Engineer Battalion
 173 Engineer Battalion
 174 Engineer Battalion
 314 Assault Engineers Battalion
 474 Engineer Battalion
 662 Engineer Battalion

References

External links
Official Website

E
E
E
E